The Extremely Tragic Story of Celal Tan and His Family is a 2011 Turkish comedy-drama film, written and directed by Onur Ünlü, starring Selçuk Yöntem as a widowed constitutional law professor, whose life takes a turn for the worse when he remarries to a university student, whose life he has saved. The film was awarded Best Film and Best Screenplay at the 18th International Adana Golden Boll Film Festival (September 17–25, 2011) where it premiered.

Release and reception

Festival screenings 
World Premiere: 18th International Adana Golden Boll Film Festival (September 17–25, 2011)

Awards 
18th International Adana Golden Boll Film Festival (September 17–25, 2011)
 Best Film: (won)
 Best Screenplay: Onur Ünlü  (won)
 Jury Award for Best Ensemble Cast Performance: (won)

See also
 Turkish films of 2011
 2011 in film

External links 
 
 Film page on Filmpot

References

2011 comedy-drama films
Films set in Turkey
Films set in Istanbul
2011 films
Best Picture Golden Boll Award winners
Films scored by Attila Özdemiroğlu
Turkish comedy-drama films
2010s Turkish-language films